Cochylichroa avita is a species of moth of the family Tortricidae. It is found in the United States, where it has been recorded from Maryland and Ontario.

Cochylichroa avita was formerly a member of the genus Cochylis, but was moved to the redefined genus Cochylichroa in 2019 as a result of phylogenetic analysis.

References

Tortricinae
Moths described in 1997